The Dutch Eerste Divisie in the 1986–87 season was contested by 19 teams. FC Volendam won the championship.

New entrants
Relegated from the 1985–86 Eredivisie
 SC Heracles
 MVV
 NEC Nijmegen

League standings

Promotion competition
In the promotion competition, four period winners (the best teams during each of the four quarters of the regular competition) played for promotion to the Eredivisie.

See also
 1986–87 Eredivisie
 1986–87 KNVB Cup

References
Netherlands - List of final tables (RSSSF)

Eerste Divisie seasons
2
Neth